Goliath is the debut album by the American heavy metal band Butcher Babies, released on July 9, 2013 in the U.S., and July 22 in Europe. The album was produced by Josh Wilbur.

Reception and sales
The single "I Smell A Massacre" reached No. 8 on the Liquid Metal Devil's Dozen countdown and "Magnolia Blvd." is played on Octane.
'GOLIATH' landed the Butcher Babies at the top spot on the Billboard New Artist/Heatseakers chart at No. 3;  while also entering the Billboard Top 200 album chart at No. 112 with first-week sales selling about 3,300 copies.

Recording, release and promotion
The Butcher Babies have stated in an interview that "Working with Josh Wilbur was an incredible experience because he helped us explore ourselves as musicians and further develop the unique sound that is the BUTCHER BABIES," said the band of their recording experience. "Being a debut album, this has been in the works since we were young, and we are so proud to have created a collaboration of all our personal influences into one complete sound."

Carla stated on behalf of their first full-length being released on a major label, "We needed a label to take us to that next level. We're very proud of what we did on our own, but it was time to give the reins to someone else. We're very hands on. We run everything, but we need that machine behind us as well."

Singles
On June 6, the band released the first single off their debut album "I Smell A Massacre".[11] On June 20, the band streamed two other songs titled "The Deathsurround" & "Magnolia Blvd.".[12]

On June 6, a lyric video for the song ''I Smell a Massacre was released.

Track listing

Personnel

Butcher Babies
Carla Harvey – vocals
Heidi Shepherd – vocals
Henry Flury – guitars
Jason Klein – bass
Chris Warner – drums

Production
Josh Wilbur – production

Album charts

References

2013 debut albums
Butcher Babies albums